"BDY On Me" (meaning "Body On Me") is a song by American R&B recording artist Omarion. The record is produced by J Maine and co-produced by Cisco. It was released online February 3, 2017.

Background
Omarion first previewed the song on his Instagram account in February 2017. The pre-chorus of the song interpolates "Too Close" by the group Next.

Music video
The music video premiered on February 3, 2017 on YouTube and was shot in Cape Town, South Africa.

References

Atlantic Records singles
Songs written by Christopher Dotson
Omarion songs
2017 singles
2017 songs